Bob Bryan and Mike Bryan were the defending champions and successfully defended their title, defeating Jonathan Erlich and Andy Ram 7–6(8–6), 6–2 in the final.

Seeds

  Bob Bryan /  Mike Bryan (champions)
  Jonathan Erlich /  Andy Ram  (final)
  Julian Knowle /  Jürgen Melzer (first round)
  František Čermák /  Jaroslav Levinský (quarterfinals)

Draw

Draw

- Mens Doubles, 2007 Tennis Channel Open